Air Dravida was an airline project based in Chennai, India, promoted  by Premier Tours & Travels and Zircon International, a construction company with business interests in Malaysia and Singapore. The company intended to commence operations in October 2006 within southern India using a fleet of Bombardier CRJ-200 aircraft but never completed its establishing process and was shut down in the same year.

History 

Air Dravida's parent company, Premier Tours And Travels (Chennai) Ltd was founded in 1982. In 2004, they planned to start an airline division. The company announced they were waiting for approvals from the Directorate General of Civil Aviation (DGCA) to commence operations with a fleet of four CRJ 200 aircraft to connect the cities of Chennai, Bangalore, Hyderabad, Kochi, Madurai and Trivandrum with hubs at Chennai, Bangalore and Hyderabad. The company was formally launched in November 2005 but never completed its establishing process and was shut down again in the same year.

External links
Website of Promoter

References

Proposed airlines of India